National Iranian Copper Industries Company abbreviated as NICICO (Shirkat-e Mili-ye Sânai'-ye Mis-e Iran) is an Iranian publicly traded corporation. This company mines 700,000 tons of copper annually. As of 2020, total sales of the company topped 220 trillion rials (about $5.2 billion).

Stakeholders 
 IMIDRO (%12)

Contractors 
 Heavy Equipment Production Company (HEPCO)

Mining locations 
 Shahr-e Babak
 Sungun copper mine

References 

Companies listed on the Tehran Stock Exchange
Government-owned companies of Iran
Iranian brands
Non-renewable resource companies established in 1971
Companies based in Tehran
Iranian companies established in 1971